Asteracanthus (from  , 'star' and  , 'spine') is an extinct genus of hybodontiform, known from the Middle Jurassic (Bathonian) to the Early Cretaceous (Valanginian).

Description 

The dentition of Astercanthus is high crowned and multicusped.

Fossil records
This genus has been reported from the Middle Triassic to the Cretaceous, though the genus as currently circumscribed dates from the Bathonian-Valanginian, predominantly of Europe. Fossils are found in the marine strata of United States, Iran, Switzerland, Madagascar, Morocco and Europe. A complete skeleton was described in 2021 from the Late Jurassic (Tithonian) aged Solnhofen Limestone. Previously considered synonymous, the genus Strophodus (Middle Triassic-Late Cretaceous) is now considered distinct, with the teeth of Asteracanthus having more in common with Hybodus and Egertonodus.

Life habits 
The genus seems to have been adapted for open marine conditions and likely had an epibenthic habit.

Species
Species within this genus include:
Asteracanthus acutus Agassiz 1837 
Asteracanthus aegyptiacus Stromer, 1927
Asteracanthus granulosus Egerton 1854                                                                      
Asteracanthus magnus Agassiz 1838
Asteracanthus medius Owen 1869
Asteracanthus minor Agassiz 1837
Asteracanthus ornatissimus Agassiz 1837
Asteracanthus papillosus Egerton 1854
Asteracanthus semisulcatus Agassiz 1837
Asteracanthus siderius Leidy 1870
Asteracanthus somaensis Yabe 1902
Asteracanthus tenuis Agassiz 1838
Asteracanthus udulfensis Leuzinger et al. 2017

References

L. Agassiz. 1837. Recherches Sur Les Poissons Fossiles. Tome III (livr. 8–9). Imprimérie de Petitpierre, Neuchatel viii-72

Hybodontiformes
Triassic fish of Europe
Permian fish of North America
Devonian first appearances
Cretaceous extinctions
Devonian sharks
Carboniferous sharks
Permian sharks
Triassic sharks
Jurassic sharks
Cretaceous sharks
Prehistoric shark genera
Fossil taxa described in 1837
Taxa named by Louis Agassiz